Little Glenn is a human-size bronze statue of a young working-class boy pulling a  stone obelisk in a four-wheeled cart. On the obelisk are carved the words "To serve and protect", the motto of the police force of Toronto, Ontario, Canada.

Little Glenn is located on the intersection of Bay and Grenville, in front of the Metro Toronto Police Headquarters. It was erected in 1988 by the Canadian sculptor Eldon Garnet as a part of a composition of three human-size sculptures surrounding the police station.

External links
Eldon Garnet website

Toronto Police Service
Monuments and memorials in Toronto
Outdoor sculptures in Canada
Bronze sculptures in Canada
1988 sculptures
Statues in Canada